Jeffrey Neal "Jeff" Pezzati (born February 6, 1960) is the lead singer of the Chicago punk band Naked Raygun. From 1983 to 1985, he also played bass for the band Big Black. In 1980 Pezzati was asked to audition for Naked Raygun (then known as Negro Commando). Pezzati passed the audition and became the band's longest-running member. The band has been credited by Dave Grohl of Nirvana/Foo Fighters fame for inspiring the then 13 year old Grohl to get into punk music. 

In 1999 Pezzati founded the band The Bomb.

Partial discography

Big Black 
 Bulldozer (1983)
 Racer-X (EP) (1984)
 The Hammer Party LP (1986)

 Naked Raygun 
 Basement Screams EP (1983)
 Throb Throb LP (1985)
 All Rise LP (1986)
 Jettison LP (1988)
 Understand? LP (1989)Vanilla Blue / Slim Single (1989)Home Single (1990)
 Raygun...Naked Raygun LP (1990)
 Last of the Demohicans DVD (1997)
 Free Shit! live LP/CD (2001)
 What Poor Gods We Do Make CD (2007)Iron Maiden /  Single (2012)
 Burning Red / Out of Your Mind Single (2013)
 Can't Let Go / Just For Me Single (2014)
 Over the Overlords LP (2021)

 The Bomb 
 Arming EP (1999)
 Torch Songs LP (2000)
 Indecision LP (2005)
 Speed Is Everything LP (2009)
 The Challenger LP (2011)
 Axis of Awesome'' EP (2014)

References 

American people of Italian descent
American people of Lombard descent
1960 births
Living people
Big Black members
American male musicians
Noise rock musicians
Post-hardcore musicians
Musicians from Chicago
Naked Raygun members